The Hans-Reinhart-Ring (in French: Anneau Hans-Reinhart; in Italian: Anello Hans Reinhart; in Romansh: Anè da Hans Reinhart)  is a prestigious Swiss award in theatre. Since 2014 it is part of the Swiss Theater Awards as the Grand Award for Theater/Hans Reinhardt Ring.

Following a grant by the poet and patron Hans Reinhart (1880-1963), the ring honors a noted personality in the field. It was awarded since 1957 by the "Schweizerische Gesellschaft für Theaterkultur" (Société Suisse du Théâtre, Società Svizzera di Studi Teatrali, Societad Svizra per Cultura da Teater). Unlike the Iffland-Ring, a new ring is custom made for each laureate. It is now awarded by the federal jury for theater, and given by a representative of the above-mentioned Swiss society for theater.

Laureates 
1957: Margrit Winter
1958: Leopold Biberti
1959: Traute Carlsen
1960: Käthe Gold
1961: Marguerite Cavadaski
1962: Heinrich Gretler
1963: Ernst Ginsberg
1964: Michel Simon
1965: Maria Becker
1966: Max Knapp
1967: Lisa Della Casa
1968: Charles Apothéloz
1969: Leopold Lindtberg
1970: Ellen Widmann
1971: Rolf Liebermann
1972: Carlo Castelli
1973: Inge Borkh
1974: Annemarie Düringer
1975: Charles Joris
1976: Dimitri
1977: Max Röthlisberger
1978: Edith Mathis
1979: Peter Brogle
1980: Philippe Mentha
1981: Ruodi Barth
1982: Heinz Spoerli
1983: Reinhart Spörri
1984: Ruedi Walter
1985: Benno Besson
1986: Annemarie Blanc
1987: Werner Düggelin
1988: Emil Steinberger
1989: François Rochaix
1990: Gardi Hutter
1991: Bruno Ganz
1992: (not awarded)
1993: Paul Roland
1994: Ketty Fusco
1995: Rolf Derrer
1996: Mathias Gnädinger
1997: Luc Bondy
1998: Werner Hutterli
1999: Gerd Imbsweiler and Ruth Oswalt
2000: Werner Strub
2001: Peter Schweiger
2002: Anna Huber
2003: Gisèle Sallin and  Véronique Mermoud
2004: Brigitta Luisa Merki
2005: Dominique Catton
2006: Roger Jendly
2007: Giovanni Netzer
2008: Nadja Sieger, Urs Wehrli and Tom Ryser
2009: Jean-Marc Stehlé
2010: Volker Hesse
2011: Christoph Marthaler
2012: Daniele Finzi Pasca
2013: Yvette Théraulaz
2014: Omar Porras

References

External links 
  The Theater Prizes on the FOC's website
  The Swiss Grand prix Theatre/Hans Reinhardt Ring on the Swiss Theatre Awards website
 List of Hans-Reinhart-Ring laureates

Swiss theatre awards
Swiss awards